Hunter Tylo (born Deborah Jo Hunter; July 3, 1962) is an American actress, author and former model. She is best known for her role as Taylor Hayes (1990–2002, 2004–14, 2018–19) on The Bold and the Beautiful.

Early life
Tylo was born Deborah Jo Hunter in Fort Worth, Texas, the daughter of Jo Anne and Morris Jabez Hunter. She is of Cherokee descent on her mother's side. She has an older brother Jay, who died on August 29, 2018, and a younger brother named Cliff. Tylo has been credited as Deborah Morehart; Morehart was the last name of her first husband.

Career
In 1984, credited as Deborah Morehart, Tylo appeared in the sorority slasher film The Initiation with future Melrose Place actress Daphne Zuniga. Tylo subsequently became well known after playing regular roles in US daytime soap operas. Her television debut was on All My Children in 1985. She was fired from the role in 1988, on the grounds of having a relationship with another cast member, Michael Tylo (whom she married in 1987).

In 1989, she was cast as Marina Toscano, the half-sister of Isabella Toscano, on Days of Our Lives. The character was an antagonist who caused trouble for one of the soap's most popular couples, Steven "Patch" Johnson and Kayla Brady. Tylo later said, "Everyone hated my character.[...] I hated her. They [producers] said they were going to do something with her, but they never did. [...] I dreaded going to work for the last few weeks I was on the show." The character was later killed off and Tylo left the series in 1990.

Discouraged by her lack of success on soap operas, Tylo decided to quit acting and enrolled at Fordham University in the Bronx, New York, intending to be a pre-med student. As she and her husband were preparing to move to New York City, she was offered the role of Dr. Taylor Hayes on The Bold and the Beautiful. She initially resisted the part but eventually relented. She began her tenure in 1990, while still pursuing her degree at Fordham.

In 2000, Tylo released her autobiography, Making a Miracle.  Tylo left The Bold and the Beautiful in 2002. She returned to the show in 2004 for a two-episode appearance as a vision.  In May 2005, she returned as a series regular and left the series again in July 2013. In 2014 she returned to the show for a several weeks story arc.

Tylo has been listed twice on People magazine's list of "50 Most Beautiful People In The World".

Lawsuit
In 1996, Tylo was cast in the primetime soap opera Melrose Place and opted to leave The Bold and the Beautiful to take the role. However, she was fired by Melrose Place producer Aaron Spelling prior to filming any episodes for the series when she announced she was pregnant. The character she was to play, Taylor McBride, was recast with Lisa Rinna taking the role. Tylo quickly returned to The Bold and the Beautiful. Tylo sued Spelling on grounds of discrimination for being pregnant and won $4.8 million from a Los Angeles jury. Spelling argued that Tylo's pregnancy rendered her unable to play the character, who was supposed to be a sexy seductress. During the trial, Tylo published pictures of herself while pregnant which showed that she retained a slim figure. Prior to trial, during the discovery phase of the litigation, Tylo's lawyers won a partial victory in an interlocutory appeal challenging a lower court's order compelling her to answer a broad range of personal questions. The Court of Appeal established Tylo's right to refuse to answer questions in her deposition about marital problems and psychological treatment, although the Court sustained the portion of the order which compelled her to answer questions about her efforts to become pregnant, her husband's ability or inability to impregnate her, and communications with her agent with respect to her efforts and ability to become pregnant. The case is widely recognized as an important one in establishing the right of privacy in deposition and the right of actresses to continue to work while pregnant.

Personal life

Marriages and children
Tylo has been married three times and has four children. She married her first husband, Tom Morehart, in  January 1980 at age 17. They have a son, Christopher "Chris". Tylo and Morehart divorced in 1984.

In 1987, she married actor Michael Tylo. The couple had two daughters, Izabella Gabrielle and Katya Ariel Tylo, and one son, Michael Edward "Mickey" Tylo Jr. In 1998, Katya was diagnosed with a rare cancer of the eye called retinoblastoma. Doctors removed the affected right eye and began chemotherapy. Later in the year, a tumor was detected in Katya's other eye; that tumor inexplicably disappeared. Katya recovered and wears a prosthetic right eye. The couple divorced in 2005. On October 18, 2008, their 19-year-old son drowned in the family pool in Henderson, Nevada. The Clark County Coroner concluded that Michael Tylo Jr.'s death was caused by "drowning due to seizure disorder" and was ruled accidental.

In May 2008, Tylo filed a restraining order against boyfriend Corey Cofield, claiming that he had acted violently towards her and her children.

Shortly after the death of her mother, Joanne Hunter, on November 29, 2009, Tylo married Gersson Archila in Las Vegas, Nevada. The marriage was annulled on August 30, 2018, due to court findings of Gersson being of poor moral character, three convicted counts of spousal abuse, auto theft, drug paraphernalia, misrepresentation by false identity, and hiding a criminal past.

Religion
Tylo is a born again Christian. She attributes her daughter Katya's recovery from cancer to constant prayer and credits her faith for helping her deal with the death of her son, Michael.

Filmography

Film

Television

Awards and nominations

References

External links

Hunter Tylo Official Site

Hunter Tylo on the Net 
Retinoblastoma International

1962 births
20th-century American actresses
21st-century American actresses
American evangelicals
American film actresses
American soap opera actresses
American television actresses
American people of Cherokee descent
Fordham University alumni
Living people
Actresses from Fort Worth, Texas